Thi Thi Win (born 23 July 1971) is an archer from Myanmar. She represented Myanmar in archery at the 2000 Summer Olympics in Sydney, Australia.

Career 
Win competed in the 2000 Summer Olympics.  She scored 567 points in the ranking round and finished 62nd out of 64.  She was defeated 167-134 by Kim Nam-Soon in the round of 64.

Win won a bronze medal in the women's team event in archery at the 2001 Southeast Asian Games.

References

External links
 
 
 

1971 births
Living people
Archers at the 2000 Summer Olympics
Burmese female archers
Olympic archers of Myanmar